The 2013 FIFA Beach Soccer World Cup Final was the last match of the 2013 FIFA Beach Soccer World Cup which took place on September 28, 2013 at the Tahua To'ata Stadium, in the Tahitian capital, Papeete. The final was contested between Spain, who had never competed in the FIFA final before, and defending champions Russia. Team Russia won the FIFA Beach Soccer World Cup for the second time.

Road to the final

Match details

Overall Statistics

References

Final
2013